Aylsham is a village in the Canadian province of Saskatchewan within the Rural Municipality of Nipawin No. 487 and Census Division No. 14.

History 
Aylsham incorporated as a village on 4 August 1947. The Aylsham post office was opened in 1921, named after Aylsham, Norfolk, England, which in turn was adopted for the community's name.

Demographics 

Climate

Notable people 
 Greg Classen Former NHL hockey player
 Karlene Faith Canadian writer, feminist, scholar, and human rights activist

See also 
 List of communities in Saskatchewan
 Villages of Saskatchewan

References

Villages in Saskatchewan
Nipawin No. 487, Saskatchewan
Division No. 14, Saskatchewan